{{chembox
| Watchedfields = changed
| verifiedrevid = 443528634
| Reference =<ref>Citronellal, The Merck Index, 12th Edition</ref>
| Name = Citronellal
| ImageFile_Ref = 
| ImageFile = Structural formula of (RS)-Citronellal.svg
| ImageSize = 150
| ImageAlt = Skeletal formula of (+)-citronellal
| ImageFile1 = (+)-Citronellal 3D ball.png
| ImageAlt1 = Ball-and-stick model of the (+)-citronellal molecule
| ImageCaption1 = (+)-Citronellal
| ImageFile2 = (-)-Citronellal 3D ball.png
| ImageAlt2 = Ball-and-stick model of the (-)-citronellal molecule
| ImageCaption2 = (-)-Citronellal
| IUPACName = 3,7-dimethyloct-6-enal
|Section1=
|Section2=
|Section3=
|Section4=
}}

Citronellal or rhodinal (C10H18O) is a monoterpenoid aldehyde, the main component in the mixture of terpenoid chemical compounds that give citronella oil its distinctive lemon scent.

Citronellal is a main isolate in distilled oils from the plants Cymbopogon (excepting C. citratus, culinary lemongrass), lemon-scented gum, and lemon-scented teatree. The (S'')-(−)-enantiomer of citronellal makes up to 80% of the oil from kaffir lime leaves and is the compound responsible for its characteristic aroma.

Citronellal has insect repellent properties, and research shows high repellent effectiveness against mosquitoes. Another research shows that citronellal has strong antifungal qualities.

Compendial status 
 British Pharmacopoeia

See also
 Citral
 Citronellol
 Citronella oil
 Hydroxycitronellal
 Perfume allergy

References

Flavors
Alkenals
Monoterpenes